Boğazpınar (formerly Boğazkinir) is a village in Tarsus district of Mersin Province, Turkey. The village is situated in the mountainous area and just at the east of a canyon. The population of the village was 256 as of 2012.

References

Villages in Tarsus District